Knokke is a town in the municipality of Knokke-Heist, which is located in the province of West Flanders in Flanders, Belgium. The town itself has 15,708 inhabitants (2007), while the municipality of Knokke-Heist has 33,818 inhabitants (2009).

Knokke is the most north-eastern seaside resort on the Belgian coast. It lies adjacent to the Dutch border; separated from the Dutch territory by the Zwin nature reserve. Knokke came into existence as a result of the construction of dikes that were to protect the area around the 'Zwin' sea-arm.

Originally a vacation haven for the city folk of Brussels in the early 19th century, artists such as James Ensor, Alfred Verwee and others started to frequent the small hamlet to paint its beautiful vistas. The artists rented a small miller's cottage and founded the Cercle des Artistes in 1880. It gradually became a resort town with upscale clientele, restaurants and shops. St. George's Anglican Church serves the English-speaking community.

Nowadays Knokke is well known for its beaches and for the dike system to which it owes its origins. The largest of Belgium's ten casinos, Knokke Casino, is located on a seaside promenade and is open 20 hours a day.

The town lies at the northern end of the Belgian Coast Tram line and is also served by NMBS trains at Knokke railway station. The N34 connects Knokke to De Panne.

In popular culture
Knokke is immortalised in the Jacques Brel song, "Jacky (Le Chanson de Jacky)": Even if one day in Knokke-le-Zoute/I become, as I fear/Singer for old women... It does not feature in the English language version written by Mort Shuman.

Gallery

External links 

 

Populated places in West Flanders
Seaside resorts in Belgium
Knokke-Heist